The Saigon Heat is a Vietnamese professional basketball team based in Ho Chi Minh City, Vietnam. Since the 2014 season, the Heat's home games are played at the CIS Arena on the campus of the Canadian International School in District 7. Saigon Heat is the first professional basketball team based in Vietnam.

The Heat also operates a developmental team that plays in the Vietnam Basketball Association, Vietnam's first professional basketball league.

History
Saigon Heat is the first professional basketball team in Vietnam based in Ho Chi Minh City. They were officially announced as a member of the ASEAN Basketball League in October 2011. The team was formed by the Saigon Sports Academy, a multi-sports training academy launched in January 2009 and located in Ho Chi Minh City, Vietnam.

In their inaugural season, the Heat finished sixth in the ABL with a regular season record of 8–13. The Heat did not qualify in for the 2012 ABL Playoffs. The Heat followed up their inaugural season with another disappointing sixth-place finish in an injury plagued 2013 season, highlighted by a twelve-game losing streak.

Thirteen games into the 2014 season, head coach Jason Rabedeaux suddenly died, the main cause of death was traumatic brain injury. Coach Rabedeaux's assistant Anthony Garbelotto was named the new head coach. The Heat finished the season in fourth place, clinching their first ever playoff berth. The Heat were swept 0–2 by the Westports Malaysia Dragons in the 2014 ABL Playoffs.

Following the completion of the 2015–16 season, the Heat announced the formation of Vietnam's first professional basketball league, the Vietnam Basketball Association, where they would field a developmental team. The Heat VBA team consists of local players, with several of the ABL side's players being distributed among the other VBA teams for league parity purposes.

Logos

Season-by-season record

Home arenas
 Tân Bình Stadium (2012–2013)
 CIS Sports Arena (2014–present)

Roster

Depth chart

Head coaches
  Robert Newson (2012)
  Jason Rabedeaux † (2012–2014)
  Anthony Garbelotto (2014–2017)
  Kyle Julius (2017–2019)
  Kevin Yurkus (2019–2022)
  Matthew Van Pelt (2022–Present)

References

External links
  
  
 Saigon Heat at ASEANBasketballLeague.com

ASEAN Basketball League teams
Basketball teams established in 2011
Basketball teams in Vietnam
2011 establishments in Vietnam